MNOS may refer to:

 Metal–nitride–oxide–semiconductor transistor (MNOS transistor), a semiconductor technology
 MobilNaya Operatsionnaya Sistema, a Unix-like operating system developed in the Soviet Union